Daniel Kidane (born 1986) is a British composer. His piece "Woke" opened the last night of the 2019 Proms.

In 2016 his "Sirens" was one of a group of five short works commissioned by the BBC Philharmonic to commemorate the 400th anniversary of Shakespeare's death, and performed in the Bridgewater Hall.  The Guardian'''s reviewer described it as a "propulsive, eclectic piece" which "soaked up influences of jungle, dubstep and R&B sampled from a trawl through the city after dark. "His 2017 work "Zulu" was performed by the Royal Scottish National Orchestra. His "Dream Song" was premiered at the Queen Elizabeth Hall by the Chineke! Orchestra on the re-opening of the hall in 2018 and the 50th anniversary of the funeral of Martin Luther King Jr., and includes words from his "I Have a Dream" speech. The concert was broadcast by BBC Radio 3. The orchestra later recorded the work on their album Spark Catchers''.

In 2020 he was commissioned by Huddersfield Choral Society to write "We'll Sing", with words by Simon Armitage, who worked from a list of words sent by choir members to reflect their experience of lockdown during the COVID-19 pandemic. This was released on a music video in Autumn 2020.

In 2022 Kidane joined the Schott Music publishing company.

Early life and education
Kidane was born in 1986. His mother is Russian and his father is Eritrean. He was born and grew up in Britain. He played the recorder and the violin at school, and sang in the children's chorus of the English National Opera, but chose to study composition at the Royal Northern College of Music, where he graduated with a B.Mus. in 2012. He has also studied at the St. Petersburg Conservatoire under Sergei Slonimsky.

References

1986 births
Living people
British people of Eritrean descent
British people of Russian descent
21st-century British composers
British classical composers
British male classical composers 
21st-century British male musicians